Monapo is a town in northern Mozambique.

Transport 

It is a junction station on the Nacala Railway.

See also 

 Railway stations in Mozambique

References 

Populated places in Nampula Province